Little Hills 158A is an Indian reserve of the Lac La Ronge Indian Band in Saskatchewan. It is 6 miles south-west of La Ronge, and on the north bank of the Little Hills River.

References

Indian reserves in Saskatchewan
Division No. 18, Saskatchewan